Carrier Strike Group Eleven 2004–2009 operations included three overseas deployments to provide combat air support for Operation Iraqi Freedom and Operation Enduring Freedom in Afghanistan, as well as a special surge deployment during 2007. The surge deployment occurred when the Yokohama-based aircraft carrier  underwent a yard overhaul.  CSG 11 has also participated in several mult-lateral naval exercises, including Valiant Shield 2007, Malabar 07-2 with India, Key Resolve/Foal Eagle 2008 off Korea, and a major 2009 undersea warfare exercise (USWEX 09), as well as participation in Theater Security Cooperation activities with various regional naval forces.

In 2004-09, the strike group was based at Naval Air Station North Island, and its flagship was the nuclear-powered aircraft carrier .

2004 training and maintenance cycle

The carrier Nimitz completed a successful Fleet Replacement Squadron Carrier Qualification (FRSCQ) five-day underway period, returning to NAS North Island on 24 September 2004.  During the underway period, Nimitzs Air Department assisted with 621 arrested landings to support the FRSCQ. The flight deck crew also conducted another 84 traps to support additional Landing Signal Officer (LSO) proficiency training, VX-23's lateral asymmetry testing, and pilot qualifications or re-qualifications.  Nimitz had returned to full operational status after a six-month pierside Planned Incremental Availability, and it also had completed its Command Assessment of Readiness and Training – Phase II.  Nimitz completed its Tailored Ship's Training Availabilities (TSTA) phases I, II and III, and Final Evaluation Period in preparation for its Composite Training Unit Exercise (COMPTUEX) certification training on 20 November 2004.

Carrier Strike Group Eleven (CSG 11) carried a virtual exercise between 26–27 October 2004. In early November 2004, CARSTRKGRU 11 trained together in actuality for the first time when Nimitz, Carrier Air Wing 11, the cruiser Princeton, and DESRON-23 destroyers  and  operated off the coast of southern Californioa prior to its COMPTUEX exercises. On 24 March 2005, CARSTRKGRU 11 completed its Joint Task Force Exercise (JTFEX) 05-03 certification training in preparation for its 2005 Western Pacific (WESTPAC) deployment.

2005 Operations

2005 pre-deployment training exercises
On 2 December 2004, CSG 11 underwent its Composite Unit Training Exercise (COMPUTEX) off the coast of southern California.  It completed its two-week Joint Task Force Exercise (JTFEX), returning to Naval Station San Diego on 25 March 2005.  CARSTRKGRU 11 subsequently conducted Fleet Replacement Squadron Carrier Qualifications off the coast of southern California in April.

2005 WESTPAC deployment
Carrier Strike Group Eleven departed San Diego, California, on 7 May 2005 under the command of Rear Admiral Peter Daly. The group deployed to the Persian Gulf to carry out Maritime Security Operations in support of Operation Enduring Freedom.  The patrols carried out by the group's warships aimed to deny international terrorists the use of the maritime environment. Carrier Strike Group Eleven returned home on 8 November 2005.

Force composition

Fifth Fleet operations
On 21 July 2005, the guided-missile cruiser USS Princeton responded to a radio call from an Iranian dhow, named Hamid, that was dead in the water and in need of engineering assistance. A rescue-and-assistance team was dispatched to the Hamid where it was determined that the engine would not start due to corroded batteries that were low on power. The batteries were removed and brought back to Princeton for maintenance, cleaning, and recharging.  The Princeton rescue team was able to restore the power on board Hamid, restart the engines, and then provide minor medical assistance and fresh water to the dhow's crew.

Exercises and port visits

2006 training and maintenance cycle
The carrier Nimitz comducted its Inspection and Survey (INSURV) off the coast of southern California in January 2006, and the carrier subsequently conducted its Fleet Replacement Squadron Carrier Qualifications (FRS-CQ) exercises in February. Between 10–11 February 2006, Nimtz transferred munitions from the carrier  and fast combat support ship  in preparation for Nimitzs six-month Planned Incremental Availability (PIA) shipyard maintenance period.  Nimtz underwent post-PIA sea trials in August.

On 2 November 2006, Nimtz completed its Tailored Ship's Training Availability (TSTA) exercises after more than 30 days underway at sea.  Nimtz and CVW 11 underwent their Composite Training Unit Exercise (COMPTUEX) off the coast of southern California in December.

2007 Operations

2007 pre-deployment exercises
The carrier Nimitz completed its Fleet Replacement Squadron Carrier Qualifications (FRS-CQ) of the southern Californian coast, returning to Naval Air Station North Island on 15 February 2007.  Carrier Strike Group Eleven underwent its Joint Task Force Exercise (JTFEX) off the southern Californian coast later that February.

2007 WESTPAC Deployment
Carrier Strike Group Eleven (CARSTRKGRU 11) deployed from San Diego on 2 April 2007 was under the command of Rear Admiral John Terence Blake, and it arrived back to San Diego on 30 September 2007, completing its six-month deployment to the Western Pacific (WESTPAC) and Middle East.

Force composition

Fifth Fleet operations

The deployment continued the current U.S. Navy two-carrier presence in the U.S. Central Command area of responsibility, demonstrating the U.S. resolve to build regional security and bring long-term stability to the region. The strike group worked closely with regional allies to support Operation Enduring Freedom and Operation Iraqi Freedom as well as to conduct Maritime Security Operations (MSO). CARSTRKGRU 11 entered the U.S. Fifth Fleet area of operations on 8 May 2007 and began conducting missions in support of Operation Enduring Freedom (OEF) on 11 May 2007. It also provided close airpower support and reconnaissance to the International Security Assistance Force (ISAF) in Afghanistan.

The destroyer Higgins played a critical role conducting Maritime Security Operations (MSO) in the Persian Gulf with its visit, board, search and seizure (VBSS) teams, conducting Interaction Patrols (IPATS) in which they distributed information on coalition aims and objectives to three Iraqi dhows.  The VBSS teams also conducted security sweeps on board three Iraqi tugs and four supertankers, thereby safeguarding the merchants in the region by deterring piracy and smuggling.  Most notably, Higgins was the only ship in the CGS-1 to conduct a boarding of a tanker suspected of oil smuggling. After a thorough six-hour boarding, the VBSS team was able to clear the tanker, ensuring the safety and freedom of the high seas to merchants and traders in the area.

The cruiser Princeton served as the Air Defense Commander for Carrier Strike Group Eleven throughout its deployment in the Persian Gulf, providing close-in air defense, airspace awareness, and, if needed, acted as a ready platform for search and rescue (SAR) operations.

Valiant Shield 2007, Malabar 07-2, and CARAT 2007
CARSTRKGRU 11 also joined the Kitty Hawks strike group, and India's aircraft carrier  in the Bay of Bengal for the multilateral Exercise Malabar 07-2, an annual exercise to advance mutual maritime understanding and interoperability involving the navies ships from India, Australia, Japan, and Singapore.

The destroyer Pinckney participated in a Cooperation Afloat Readiness Training (CARAT) exercise with the Republic of Singapore Navy and three other U.S. Navy ships.  The bilateral force conducted air defense, anti-surface warfare, anti-subsurface warfare, and VBSS operations in the compressed waterspace of the South China Sea, validating current tactics, techniques and procedures and identifying areas for further development.

2007 sustainment training exercises
The carrier Nimitz underwent a series of sustainment training exercises off the coast of southern California during December 2007.

2008 FRP surge deployment

2008 WESTPAC deployment
Carrier Strike Group Eleven (CARSTRKGRU 11) deployed from San Diego on 24 January 2008 under the Navy's fleet response plan (FRP) and will operate in the Western Pacific in support of U.S. commitments in the region while the forward-deployed  undergoes scheduled maintenance in Yokosuka, Japan.<ref>{{cite web | title= Questions & Answers | url= http://www.cffc.navy.mil/summerpulse04/questions-answers.htm  | work= Summer Pulse 04 | publisher= U.S. Navy | year= 2004 | access-date=30 October 2010 |archive-url = https://web.archive.org/web/20061007190914/http://www.cffc.navy.mil/summerpulse04/questions-answers.htm |archive-date = 7 October 2006}}</ref> CARSTRKGRU 11 returned to San Diego on 2 June 2008.

Force composition

Seventh Fleet operations

Carrier Strike Group Eleven entered the U.S. Seventh Fleet area of responsibility on 8 February 2008. CSG 11 commander Rear Admiral John Terence Blake, USN, noted:

Our goal is to maintain and strengthen our alliances and friendships in the region.  Our deployment to the Western Pacific is a visible demonstration of the United States ongoing commitment to Japan and the other nations in the region. We also value our exceptionally strong relationship with the Japan Maritime Self-Defense Force and this port visit is an opportunity for us to make new friends and renew old acquaintances.

On 9 February 2008, two Russian Tu-95 'Bear' bombers were detected by CSG 11 in the Western Pacific. Reportedly, there was no radio communication between the American and Russian aircraft.

Exercises and port visits

2009–2010 Operations

2009 training and maintenance cycle
On 16 January 2009, the Nimitz underwent flight deck certification following its six-month Planned Incremental Availability shipyard period.  On 21 January 2009, Nimitz departed NAS North Island for its Fleet Replacement Squadron Carrier Qualifications off the coast of southern California.

In February, Carrier Strike Group Eleven underwent its Tailored Ship's Training Availability exercises off the coast of southern California, followed by additional FRS exercises in March. The strike group completed pre-deployment training with the completion of its Composite Training Unit Exercise in May 2009.

2009–2010 WESTPAC Deployment

Carrier Strike Group Eleven (CARSTRKGRU 11) departed San Diego on 31 July 2009 on a regularly scheduled Western Pacific (WESTPAC) deployment under the commanded by Rear Admiral John W. Miller. On 11 September 2009, the U.S. Navy announced that the near-term carrier strike group deployment schedule would be changed to accommodate the delay in the return of the carrier  from its current overhaul. This resulted in extending the current 2009–2010 WESTPAC deployment for Carrier Strike Group Eleven to eight months.

Several events highlighted the 2009 deployment of Carrier Strike Group Eleven. On 7 October 2009, a milestone was reached when an EA-6B Prowler, assigned to Tactical Electronic Attack Squadron 135 (VAQ-135), became the 100,000th aircraft to launch off Catapult Number 1 on board the Nimitz.  The successful launch was flown by Commander Vincent Johnson, the executive officer of VAQ-135. Also, on 16 Feb 2010, Captain Scott Conn, the CVW-11 deputy commander, became the 325th naval aviator to successfully complete 1,000th carrier-arrested landing (trap) when he landed his F/A-18F Super Hornet on board the Nimitz.

Several prominent individuals paid visits to Carrier Strike Group Eleven during the deployment.  General David H. Petraeus, US Army, the head of the U.S. Central Command flew on board the Nimitz to spend Thanksgiving Day 2009 on board the strike group flagship. On 6 January 2010, Admiral Gary Roughead, the Chief of Naval Operations, flew on board the Nimitz to present the Meritorious Unit Commendation to the flagship of Carrier Strike Group Eleven.  The MUC recognized the Nimitz'' for its performance during two deployments separated by the first-ever carrier incremental availability, an intense 30-day maintenance period, followed by a 10-day sustainment exercise.

On 26 March 2010, Strike Group Eleven returned to their homeport after an eight-month deployment to the U.S. Fifth Fleet and Seventh Fleet areas of responsibility (AOR).

Force composition

Fifth Fleet operations
 
On 4 December 2009, the strike group began a five-month rotation to the northern Arabian Sea, providing close air support and reconnaissance to coalition forces in Afghanistan.

CVW-11's carrier-based aircraft provided 30 percent of the combat air support for U.S./Coalition ground fighting in Afghanistan during the four-month period that CARSTRKGRU 11 operated in the northern Arabian Sea. E-2C Hawkeye aircraft assigned to Airborne Early Warning Squadron 117 (VAW-117) used their sophisticated radar and communication systems to synchronize and direct air crews over Afghanistan. Electronic Attack Squadron 135 (VAQ-135) jammed electronic signals in support of Operation Enduring Freedom. In total, Carrier Air Wing 11 air crews flew more than 2,600 combat sorties in support of operations in Afghanistan.

The strike group escort ships contributed to counter-piracy operations off the Horn of Africa, the protection of critical Iraqi infrastructure in the Persian Gulf, and other maritime security operations.

Exercises and port visits

Notes

Sources

External links
 Official Carrier Strike Group Eleven Website

Carrier Strike Groups
United States Navy in the 21st century